Gymnopleurus parvus, is a species of dung beetle found in India, Sri Lanka and Bangladesh.

Description
This oval, medium convex species has an average length of about 7 to 8 mm. Body dark, coppery or greenish-black and sometimes steely blue. Dorsum covered with minute greyish setae. There is a common spot at the base of the elytral suture. Clypeus produced into two lobes in front. Pronotum highly convex and elytra finely densely granular. Pygidium densely granular and setose. Male has flat spur of the front tibia, whereas female has slender and sharply pointed spur of front tibia.

References 

Scarabaeinae
Insects of Sri Lanka
Insects of India
Insects described in 1821